Bear Country is a 1953 American short documentary film directed by James Algar. It won an Oscar at the 26th Academy Awards in 1954 for Best Short Subject (Two-Reel). The film was produced by Walt Disney as part of the True-Life Adventures series of nature documentaries, and played with Peter Pan during its original theatrical run.

Cast
 Winston Hibler as Narrator

Reception
Bosley Crowther of The New York Times wrote that the film "follows in the excellent series of nature films that have been produced by the Disney studio, such as Seal Island and Water Birds".

Variety called it "one of the more delightful True-Life Adventure documentaries in the Walt Disney series ... calculated to enchant viewers of all ages".

The Monthly Film Bulletin wrote: "As usual in this series, the material itself is pleasantly photographed and has considerable interest. This is vitiated, however, by the irritatingly facetious tone of the commentary and by the apparent determination to make the bears appear as 'human' as possible—the set-piece, in this case, is a scene of the bears laboriously scratching themselves, to a characteristic musical accompaniment".

References

External links

1953 films
1953 short films
1953 documentary films
American short documentary films
1950s English-language films
1950s short documentary films
Live Action Short Film Academy Award winners
Disney documentary films
Documentary films about nature
Short films directed by James Algar
Disney short films
Films produced by Walt Disney
Films about bears
Films scored by Paul Smith (film and television composer)
RKO Pictures short films
1950s American films